The Handball events at the 1965 All-Africa Games were held in Brazzaville, Republic of the Congo between 16 and 24 July 1965. The competition included only men's event.

Qualified teams

Squads

Group stage

All times are local (UTC+1).

Group A

Group B

Knockout stage

Semifinals

Third place game

Final

Final standing

References

 
1965 All-Africa Games
1965
African Games